MISD is an acronym that may refer to:

Independent School Districts in Texas - M
Marion Independent School District (Iowa)
Macomb Intermediate School District
Multiple instruction, single data, a parallel computing architecture